Bluegrass Reunion is an album by American musician David Grisman released in 1991. For this album of traditional bluegrass, he put together five musicians with whom he cooperated before in some way, especially guitarist Red Allen, who provides his tenor voice for this album.

Track listing 
 "Back Up and Push" (theme) – 0:50
 "She's No Angel" (trad.) – 2:21
 "I'm Just Here to Get My Baby Out Of Jail" (Davis, Taylor) – 3:25
 "The Fields Have Turned Brown" (Stanley) – 4:42
 "To Love and Live Together" – 2:323
 "I'm Blue, I'm Lonesome" – 3:35
 "Pidgeon  Roost" – 2:14
 "Down Where the River Bends" – 3:58
 "Love Please Come Home" (Jackson) – 2:22
 "Letter From My Darlin" – 3:27
 "Is This My Destiny?" (Carter) – 3:03
 "Ashes of Love" – 2:18
 "Is it Too Late Now?" – 3:39
 "Little Maggie" – 3:00
 "Will You Miss Me When I'm Gone?" – 4:48
 "Back Up and Push" (theme) – 0:38

Personnel 
 David Grisman – mandolin, vocals
 Red Allen – guitar, vocals
 Jim Buchanan – violin, vocals
 Jerry Garcia – guitar, vocals
 Jim Kerwin – bass
 Herb Pedersen – banjo, vocals

References 

1992 albums
David Grisman albums